The Argentine Amateur Championship, or Campeonato Argentino de Aficionados, is an annual amateur golf tournament, organized by the Asociación Argentina de Golf. Among the championships for amateurs that are currently being played all over the world, the Argentine Amateur Championship is in sixth place by seniority. It has as predecessors only The Amateur Championship of Great Britain, started in 1885; the Amateur Championship of Ireland, in 1892; only for Irish natives, in 1893; the U.S. Amateur that has been played since 1894, and the Amateur Championship of New Zealand, also of 1893. The Argentine Amateur Championship shares the sixth position with the Canadian Amateur and the Amateur of Wales, both also of 1895.

The winner of the qualification tournament receives the Kenneth R Gordon Davis Cup.

This championship should not be confused with the Copa Pereyra Iraola, which is won by the low amateur at the Argentine Open.

References

Amateur golf tournaments
Golf tournaments in Argentina
Annual sporting events in Argentina
Recurring sporting events established in 1895
1895 establishments in Argentina